The 2008 Elections for the Pennsylvania House of Representatives were held on November 4, 2008, with all districts being contested. Necessary primary elections were held on April 22, 2008. The term of office for those elected in 2008 will run from January 6, 2009 until November 2010. State Representatives are elected for two-year terms, with the entire House of Representatives up for a vote every two years.

Make-up of the House following the 2008 elections

General election

References

2008 Pennsylvania elections
2008
Pennsylvania House